Wasatch Peak is a  mountain summit located in Summit County, Utah, United States.

Description
Wasatch Peak is set within the High Uintas Wilderness on land managed by Uinta-Wasatch-Cache National Forest. It is situated one mile north of the crest of the Uinta Mountains which are a subset of the Rocky Mountains. It ranks as the 14th-highest summit in Utah, and 55th-highest in the United States if a 400-foot clean prominence cutoff is considered as criteria. Neighbors include Mount Beulah three miles to the west-northwest, Mount Lovenia two miles to the south-southeast, and Dead Horse Peak is five miles to the southwest. Precipitation runoff from the mountain's west slope drains to the West Fork of Blacks Fork, whereas the east slope drains into headwaters of East Fork Blacks Fork. Topographic relief is significant as the summit rises  in one mile from the valleys on either side. This mountain's toponym has not been officially adopted by the United States Board on Geographic Names and will remain unofficial as long as the USGS policy of not adopting new toponyms in designated wilderness areas remains in effect. It is labelled on USGS topographic maps as "Wasatch" benchmark.

Climate
Based on the Köppen climate classification, Wasatch Peak is located in a subarctic climate zone with cold snowy winters and mild summers. Tundra climate characterizes the summit and highest slopes.

See also
 Geology of the Uinta Mountains

References

External links
 National Geodetic Survey Data Sheet

Mountains of Utah
Features of the Uinta Mountains
Mountains of Summit County, Utah
North American 4000 m summits
Wasatch-Cache National Forest